is a Japanese manga series by Ryūdai Ishizaka. It was serialized online via Cygames' Cycomi manga app and website from December 2017 to May 2019 and has been collected in four tankōbon volumes by Kodansha and Shogakukan. A sequel manga by Ishizaka, titled , was also serialized online via Cycomi from June 2019 to March 2021. It has been collected in six tankōbon volumes by Shogakukan. An anime television series adaptation by Blade, titled Iwa-Kakeru! -Sport Climbing Girls-, aired from October to December 2020.

Plot
Konomi Kasahara is a first-year student who attends Hanamiya Girls' High School and is a master at puzzles. While looking for a club to join, she comes across the school's climbing wall. This fateful encounter changes her life when she becomes a member of the Climbing Club.

Characters

Hanamiya Girls' High School

A first-year student at Hanamiya Girls' High School who is a master at puzzle games. The newest member of the Climbing Club, she uses her analytical skills to quickly find ideal routes up climbing walls, earning her the nicknames "Mother Eye" and "Murder Observation".

Another member of the Climbing Club who has trained in the sport since middle school. Her attitude towards other people hurts her ability to make friends outside of climbing competitions and has scared away potential new club members.

President of the Climbing Club, she is referred to as the "Princess of Lead".

Member of the Climbing Club whose flexibility helps her grab holds too difficult for others.

Kurikawa High School

A second-year student who is the ace of Kurikawa High. She is referred to as the "Climbing Spider" due to her taking advantage of her height and reach while she is climbing.

A second-year student who is referred to as the "Muscle Maxima'am" due to her muscular build and physical strength.

A first-year student who collects and analyzes data in order to prepare for competitions. Because of this, she is referred to as the "Lackey Data Climber".

St. Catalano Girls

A second-year student who is the ace of the team. She is referred to as "Black Panther" due to her explosiveness and leaping ability.

A second-year student who is supportive of Masumi. She is referred to as the "Crimson Stormtrooper" due to her being a fiery climber who is willing to help her teammates.

A first-year student who is referred to as the "Ballerina of Rock" due to her sense of balance. Despite seeing Konomi as a rival from their ballet class, Kurea secretly admires her.

Kokureikan High School

A very popular first-year student who is the ace of Kokureikan High. She is referred to as the "Princess of Climbing" due to her dominance in climbing competitions.

A second-year student who is supportive of Anne.

A student who is very good at speed climbing thanks to rhythm games. She affectionately refers to Konomi as "Puzzle-chan".

Matsubase High School

A second-year student who is referred as "Zombie Niijima" due to her ability to climb higher and higher with each attempt. 

A first-year student who speaks in cat puns. She is referred as the "novice killer" due to her desire to drive newcomers out of the sport thanks to a petty grudge she has against Jun.

Other characters

An outdoor climbing specialist who holds numerous records.

An outdoor climber who looks up to her father Jūzō and has been climbing since she was little.

A competitive climber who also works at a climbing shop. She is known as the "Shoemeister".

Media

Manga
Iwa-Kakeru! Climbing Girls, written and illustrated by Ryūdai Ishizaka, was serialized online via Cygames' Cycomi manga app and website from December 5, 2017 to May 18, 2019. A sequel manga, titled Iwa-Kakeru!! Try a new climbing, was serialized via Cycomi from June 8, 2019 to March 20, 2021.

Volume list

Iwa-Kakeru! Climbing Girls

Iwa-Kakeru!! Try a new climbing

Anime
On April 24, 2020, an anime television series adaptation, titled Iwa-Kakeru! -Sport Climbing Girls-, was announced. The series was animated by Blade and directed by Tetsurō Amino, with Touko Machida handling series composition, Yoshihiro Watanabe designing the characters, and Tsubasa Ito composing the series' music. It ran for 12 episodes from October 4 to December 20, 2020 on ABC and TV Asahi's new anime block . Aina Suzuki performed the opening theme , while Sumire Uesaka, Yui Ishikawa, Aina Suzuki, and Miyu Tomita performed the ending "LET'S CLIMB↑" as their respective characters. Crunchyroll streamed the series in North America, Central America, South America, Europe, Africa, Oceania, the Middle East, and the Commonwealth of Independent States. In South Asia and Southeast Asia, the series is licensed by Medialink.

Episode list

Stage play
A stage play of the series performed by the idol group AKB48 ran at the Sunshine Theatre in Tokyo from February 17 to February 20, 2022.

Reception

Previews
The anime series' first episode garnered mixed reviews from Anime News Network's staff during the Fall 2020 season previews. James Beckett was critical of the lack of excitement in the subject of rock climbing, characters with "functional" personalities and "terribly cheap" animation that fails to display the girls' athleticism. Nicholas Dupree commended the premiere for being "a decent ambassador" that covers its subject matter and narrative points serviceably well, but criticized Jun and Konomi's character writing and the "below average" production quality for having unappealing climbing visuals. Theron Martin and Rebecca Silverman gave similar praise to Konomi's puzzle game approach to the sport and the muscular designs of the girls' physique, with the former pointing out the "disappointingly limited" animation and "suggestive" camera angles in the rock climbing scenes and the latter being critical of Jun's unwelcoming presence. The fifth reviewer, Caitlin Moore, was critical of the use of "leering camera angles" during the climbing scenes and the characters of Konomi and Jun stretching credibility in their approach to the sport, but felt immediately hooked into the subject matter it displayed, concluding that: "Iwa-Kakeru! -Sport Climbing Girls- isn't particularly great and I doubt it'll have staying power of any kind, but it scratches a very specific itch I've had for a while."

Series reception
Moore reviewed the complete anime series in 2021 and gave it a C+ grade. While commending the vast information about rock climbing throughout the episodes and the production having "bright candy-colors and consistently on-model animation", she criticized the "suspension of disbelief" and lack of "realistic safety measures" during the rock climbing scenes, the annoyance of the secondary characters and the "fan service-driven storyboarding" that diminished the girls' athletic abilities, concluding that: "Iwa-Kakeru! is a perfectly middling anime, with a sport I enjoyed learning about, decent production values, a main cast I have no strong feelings about whatsoever, and a secondary cast that I wouldn't mind seeing cast into a pit of acid. It was made to capture a moment, but is doomed to be forgotten before that moment comes to pass, if it ever does at all."

See also
 Love Flops, an anime television series whose manga adaptation is illustrated by Ryūdai Ishizaka

Notes

References

External links
  
 

Anime series based on manga
Asahi Broadcasting Corporation original programming
Crunchyroll anime
Cygames franchises
Japanese webcomics
Kodansha manga
Medialink
School life in anime and manga
Shogakukan manga
Shōnen manga
Sports anime and manga
Webcomics in print
Works about climbing